In integral calculus, Euler's formula for complex numbers may be used to evaluate integrals involving trigonometric functions. This technique is often simpler and faster than using trigonometric identities or integration by parts, and is sufficiently powerful to integrate any rational expression involving trigonometric functions.

Euler's formula
Euler's formula states that 

Substituting  for  gives the equation

because cosine is an even function and sine is odd. These two equations can be solved for the sine and cosine to give

Examples

First example 
Consider the integral

The standard approach to this integral is to use a half-angle formula to simplify the integrand. We can use Euler's identity instead:

At this point, it would be possible to change back to real numbers using the formula . Alternatively, we can integrate the complex exponentials and not change back to trigonometric functions until the end:

Second example
Consider the integral

This integral would be extremely tedious to solve using trigonometric identities, but using Euler's identity makes it relatively painless:

Either method gives

Using real parts
In addition to Euler's identity, it can be helpful to make judicious use of the real parts of complex expressions. For example, consider the integral

The integral on the right is easy to evaluate:

Thus:

Fractions
In general, this technique may be used to evaluate any fractions involving trigonometric functions. For example, consider the integral

Using Euler's identity, this integral becomes

If we now make the substitution , the result is the integral of a rational function:

One may proceed using partial fraction decomposition.

See also

 Trigonometric substitution
 Weierstrass substitution
 Euler substitution

References

Integral calculus
Theorems in analysis
Theorems in calculus